A causal patch is a region of spacetime connected within the relativistic framework of causality (causal light cones).

Background

After Leonard Susskind proposed the black hole complementarity conjecture for black holes in quantum gravity, he realized it would also apply to a de Sitter universe with a positive cosmological constant with the cosmological horizon in place of the event horizon. The region within the horizon is the causal patch, and it is self-contained. This means we may neglect what happens beyond the cosmological horizon. A consequence of this radical conjecture is that the total number of states of the universe is finite.

References

See also 

 Black hole complementarity
 de Sitter space

Quantum gravity